Hinsdale Township High School may refer to:

 Hinsdale Township High School Central, in Illinois
 Hinsdale Township High School South, in Illinois